Salt Lake Sector – V (also known as Bandhan Bank Salt Lake Sector-V) is a station of the Kolkata Metro close to Nabadiganta Industrial Township, Salt Lake City, Kolkata, India. This metro station will be for Kolkata Metro Line 2 and Kolkata Metro Line 6. The construction of station for the Line 2 is complete and it has been inaugurated in February 2020 while that of Line 6 is in progress. The stations of Line 2 and Line 6 will be connected by over-bridge.

Structure

See also 
List of Kolkata Metro stations

References 

Kolkata Metro stations
Railway stations in Kolkata